Parrish as a surname may refer to:

Alan K. Parrish, American professor of religious education and author
Andy Parrish (born 1988), English footballer
Anne Parrish (1888–1957), American novelist and children's author
Carolyn Parrish (born 1946), Canadian politician
Celestia Susannah Parrish, (1853–1918) American psychologist and educator
Charles H. Parrish (1859–1931), American minister and educator
Dean Parrish (1942–2021), American soul singer
Deanie Parrish 1922-2022), American aviator
Dillwyn Parrish (1894–1941), American painter and illustrator
Dwight Parrish (born 1972), American ice hockey player
Gigi Parrish (1912–2006), American actress and publisher
Helen Parrish (1923–1959), American actress
Hunter Parrish (born 1987), American actor
Janel Parrish (born 1988), American actress, singer, and songwriter 
Jerry Wayne Parrish (1944–1998), American soldier and defector to North Korea
Joanna Parrish (1969–1990), English student and murder victim
Joel Parrish (born 1955), American football player
John Parrish (disambiguation), multiple people
Kehlani Parrish (born 1995), American singer and songwriter
Ken Parrish (born 1984), American football player
Lance Parrish (born 1956), American baseball player, coach, and manager
Larry Parrish (born 1953), American baseball player, coach, and manager
Lemar Parrish (born 1947), American football player
Leslie Parrish (born 1935), American actress
Man Parrish (born 1958), American electro musician and producer 
Mark Parrish (born 1977), American hockey player
Mary Virginia Cook Parrish (1862–1945), American feminist and civil rights activist
Maxfield Parrish (1870–1966), American painter and illustrator
P. J. Parrish, pseudonym of American mystery novelists Kelly Nichols and Kristy Montee
Paul Parrish, American singer, songwriter and pianist
Rebecca Parrish (1869–1952), American physician and medical missionary
Robert Parrish (1916–1995) American actor, film editor, director, and writer
Roscoe Parrish (born 1982), American football player
Sean Parrish (born 1972), Welsh footballer
Stan Parrish (born 1946), American football coach
Tony Parrish (born 1975), American football player
Warren Parrish (1803–1877), American Latter Day Saint leader

See also
Parish (surname)